The 1928 Buffalo Bisons football team represented the University of Buffalo as a member of the New York State Conference during the 1928 college football season. Led by Russell Carrick in his fifth season as head coach, the team compiled an overall record of 1–6 with a mark of 0–5 in conference play, placing last out of eight team in the New York State Conference.

Schedule

References

Buffalo
Buffalo Bulls football seasons
Buffalo Bison football